The 1892 Vanderbilt Commodores football team represented Vanderbilt University during the 1892 college football season. The team's head coach and team captain was Elliott H. Jones, who served his third and last season in that capacity. This was the first year for Vandy and University of Tennessee to play football also the first year to play at (Old) Dudley Field. The 1892 team was the oldest in the memory of Grantland Rice. He claimed Phil Connell then would be a good player in any era.

Schedule

References

Vanderbilt
Vanderbilt Commodores football seasons
Vanderbilt Commodores football